Bright Eyes is a 1934 American comedy drama film directed by David Butler.  The screenplay by William Conselman is based on a story by David Butler and Edwin J. Burke.

Plot
Five-year-old Shirley Blake (Shirley Temple) and her widowed mother, Mary (Lois Wilson), a maid, live in the home of her employers, the rich and mean-spirited Smythe family, Anita (Dorothy Christy), J. Wellington (Theodore von Eltz), their spoiled seven-year-old daughter, Joy (Jane Withers) and cantankerous wheelchair-using Uncle Ned (Charles Sellon). After Christmas morning, Shirley hitches a ride to the airport to visit her late father's pilot friends. The aviators bring her aboard an airplane and taxi her around the runways while she serenades them with a rendition of "On the Good Ship Lollipop".

Mary is killed in a traffic accident. Loop (James Dunn), one of the pilots and Shirley's godfather, takes Shirley up in an airplane. He says that she is in Heaven and that her mother is now there. When the Smythes learn of Mary's death, they plan to send Shirley to an orphanage. However, Uncle Ned, who has grown fond of "Bright Eyes", insists that Shirley stay with them. To raise money for attorney fees, Loop reluctantly accepts a lucrative contract to deliver an item by plane, cross-country to New York during a dangerous storm. Unbeknown to him, little Shirley sneaked away from the Smythes' home, found his airplane at the airport, and stowed away inside. When their plane loses control in the storm in the wilderness, they parachute to the ground together and are eventually rescued. The impasse over custody is resolved when Loop, his former fiancée Adele (Judith Allen), Uncle Ned, and Shirley all decide to live together. The Smythes leave the courthouse miserably, except Joy at first; when she rudely comments that at least they don't have to be nice to Uncle Ned anymore, her mother slaps her hard across the face.

Cast
 Shirley Temple as Shirley Blake, a five-year-old girl who is Mary Blake's daughter
 James Dunn as James "Loop" Merritt, a bachelor pilot and Shirley's godfather  
 Lois Wilson as Mary Blake, Shirley's widowed mother who works as a maid for the Smythe family  
 Judith Allen as Adele Martin, a socialite and Loop's estranged fiancée 
 Charles Sellon as Uncle Ned Smith, the Smythes' cranky patriarch who has a tenderness for Shirley
 Theodor von Eltz as J. Wellington Smythe, a haughty nouveau-riche
 Dorothy Christy as Anita Smythe, J. Wellington Smythe's equally arrogant wife 
 Jane Withers as Joy Smythe, J. Wellington & Anita's spoiled and obnoxious seven-year-old daughter
 Brandon Hurst as Higgins, the Smythes' butler 
 Jane Darwell as Elizabeth Higgins, the Smythes' cook  
 Walter Johnson as Thomas, the Smythes' chauffeur
 George Irving as Judge Thompson
 Terry as Rags, Loop's dog

Production

American Airlines and the Douglas Aircraft Company, recognizing the potential of the film in advertising air travel, cooperated in the production and distribution. They provided a DC-2, designated "A-74", aircraft for the exterior shots while a true to scale mock up was provided for the interior scenes. A 12-passenger Curtiss T-32 Condor II transport biplane, designated "Condor 151", in early American Airlines (and Air Mail) livery also features in prominent scenes. In the famous Good Ship Lollipop scene, members of the University of Southern California football team served as extras. In the second flying scene where Temple's character sneaks aboard the plane and they were forced to bail out of it, both Temple and Dunn were strapped into a harness hoisted up into the studio rafters. They were supposed to drift down with the aid of a wind machine. In the first take, someone inadvertently opened an airproof door just as they landed, creating a vacuum that sucked out the parachute and dragged them both across the studio floor. Marilyn Granas served as a stand-in for Temple as she had for her previous movies. She would later be replaced by Mary Lou Isleib who would remain as Temple's stand-in for the rest of her tenure at 20th Century Fox.

Release

Awards and honors
Temple received a miniature Oscar on February 27, 1935, for her contributions to film entertainment in 1934, chiefly for Little Miss Marker and Bright Eyes. She was the first child actor to receive an Academy Award.

The film is recognized by American Film Institute in these lists:
 2004: AFI's 100 Years...100 Songs:	
 "On the Good Ship Lollipop" – #69

Soundtrack
 "On the Good Ship Lollipop" (1934) (uncredited)
 Music by Richard A. Whiting
 Lyrics by Sidney Clare
 "Silent Night" (1818) (uncredited)
 Music by Franz Gruber
 Lyrics by Joseph Mohr
 "The Man on the Flying Trapeze" (1867) (uncredited)
 Music by Gaston Lyle
 Lyrics by George Leybourne
 Sung a cappella by Charles Sellon
 "Jingle Bells" (1857) (uncredited)
 Music by James Pierpont

See also
 Shirley Temple filmography

References
Notes

Footnotes

Works cited

 
 
  

Bibliography

   The author expounds upon father figures in Temple films.
  In the essay, "Cuteness and Commodity Aesthetics: Tom Thumb and Shirley Temple", author Lori Merish examines the cult of cuteness in America.
   The author presents an examination of social class in Bright Eyes.

External links
 
 
 
 
 

1934 films
1930s musical comedy-drama films
American Christmas comedy-drama films
American aviation films
American black-and-white films
Films about orphans
Films directed by David Butler
Fox Film films
Films produced by Sol M. Wurtzel
American musical comedy-drama films
1930s Christmas comedy-drama films
1934 comedy films
1934 drama films
Films scored by Samuel Kaylin
1930s English-language films
1930s American films